Kevin Rauhut (born 30 December 1989) is a German footballer who plays as a goalkeeper for Viktoria Köln.

Club career
On 31 January 2022, Rauhut signed with 3. Liga club Viktoria Köln.

References

External links
 

1989 births
Living people
Sportspeople from Oberhausen
Footballers from North Rhine-Westphalia
German footballers
Association football goalkeepers
TuRU Düsseldorf players
Wuppertaler SV players
Alemannia Aachen players
Sportfreunde Siegen players
KSV Hessen Kassel players
FSV Wacker 90 Nordhausen players
FC Energie Cottbus players
SC Fortuna Köln players
VfB Homberg players
FC Viktoria Köln players
3. Liga players
Regionalliga players
Oberliga (football) players